Universal Language may refer to:
Universal Language
Universal Language (Booker T album), a 1977 album by Booker T & the MGs
Universal Language (Joe Lovano album), a 1992 album by jazz saxophonist Joe Lovano

Or:
The Universal Language, a comedic play
The Universal Language (film), a 2011 film